Maher Nasser is the Director of the Outreach Division in the United Nations Department of Global Communications. He oversees varied communication initiatives and campaigns along with a number of partners, and supervises the library and bookshop. He also serves as Chairman of the Publications Board. He plays a key role in promoting the role of the UN in the world.

From April to August 2012 and from August 2014 to February 2015, he was Acting Head of the Department of Public Information, at which times the Department excelled in its performance and was highly praised by the Secretary General and partners alike.

One of he longest serving veterans of the United Nations System; for more than 36 years, he has held various positions in Gaza, Jerusalem, Amman, Cairo, Vienna and New York City. Prior to his current post, Nasser was the Director of the United Nations Information Service (UNIS) in Vienna from July 2008. Prior to that, he served as Director of the United Nations Information Centre (UNIC) in Cairo, Egypt from January 2006, leading a number of campaign with the Egyptian leadership at delicate political times. 

Nasser was the Chief of the New York Liaison Office for UNRWA before joining the Department of Public Information at the UN. He also held different posts within UNRWA in Vienna and Amman. He managed to raise large amounts of funding to help Palestinian refugees. He has also worked in the area of public information at the United Nations Drug Control Programme in Vienna (now UNODC), combating the drugs trade through policies and support to governments.

Nasser held different positions in two non-governmental organizations in Jerusalem before he joined the UN, gathering political support and money for the cause of Palestine and peace in the middle east.

In October 1991, Nasser was a key leader at the Madrid Conference of 1991 and several sessions of subsequent bilateral negotiations in Washington, D.C., as head of the Palestinian negotiating team. His role has been pivotal in the initial and successful phases of the Middle East peace process.

Nasser has a degree from Birzeit University in the West Bank, and a postgraduate degree in business administration from the University of Cambridge, in the United Kingdom. He is married with three children.

Publications
UN Chronicle: "It's never too late to start running"

References

External links
  Bringing the world into better focus
  Maher Nasser, Director of Outreach Division, DPI in NY, visited Vancouver
 
  UN Department of Public Information
  Outreach Division, DPI, UN

1962 births
Living people
Palestinian officials of the United Nations